Peters syndrome may refer to:
Peters-plus syndrome
Peters anomaly of the eye